Mohammed Ibrahim Saleh (Arabic:محمد إبراهيم صالح) (born 6 August 1997) is an Emirati footballer who plays as a midfielder.

Career
Mohammed Ibrahim started his career at Al-Nasr and is a product of the Al-Nasr's youth system. On 13 May 2017, Mohammed Ibrahim made his professional debut for Al-Nasr against Emirates Club in the Pro League, replacing Jirès Kembo Ekoko.

External links

References

1997 births
Living people
Emirati footballers
Al-Nasr SC (Dubai) players
UAE Pro League players
Association football midfielders
Place of birth missing (living people)